Luis Adriano Piedrahíta Sandoval (7 October 1946 – 11 January 2021) was a Colombian Catholic bishop.

Life
Piedrahíta Sandoval was born in 1946 and was ordained to the priesthood in 1972. He served as titular bishop of Centenarian and as auxiliary bishop of the Roman Catholic Archdiocese of Cali, Colombia, from 1999 to 2007. He then served as bishop of the Roman Catholic Diocese of Apartadó, Colombia, from 2007 to 2014 and as bishop of the Roman Catholic Diocese of Santa Marta, Colombia from 2014 until his death in 2021. 

He died on 11 January 2021, from COVID-19 during the COVID-19 pandemic in Colombia, having been diagnosed on 20 December 2020.

References

1946 births
2021 deaths
21st-century Roman Catholic bishops in Colombia
21st-century Roman Catholic titular bishops
Deaths from the COVID-19 pandemic in Colombia
Roman Catholic bishops of Santa Marta
Roman Catholic bishops of Cali
Roman Catholic bishops of Apartadó